Luis Alexander Sardiñas Avilez (born May 16, 1993) is a Venezuelan professional baseball infielder for the Algodoneros de Unión Laguna of the Mexican League. Sardiñas signed with the Texas Rangers as an amateur free agent in 2009. He made his Major League Baseball (MLB) debut with the Rangers during the 2014 season, and played for the Milwaukee Brewers in 2015, the Seattle Mariners in 2016, the San Diego Padres in 2016 and 2017, and the Baltimore Orioles in 2018.

Career

Texas Rangers
Sardiñas signed with the Texas Rangers as an amateur free agent in 2009. He started the 2013 season with the Myrtle Beach Pelicans of the Class A-Advanced Carolina League and was promoted to the Frisco RoughRiders of the Class AA Texas League during the season.

Sardiñas was ranked by MLB.com as the 84th best prospect in baseball before the 2013 season. He was considered the Rangers second best prospect by MLB.com during the 2013-14 offseason.

The Rangers promoted Sardiñas to the major leagues on April 19, 2014. He made his major league debut the next day. He collected his first Major League hit off of Andre Rienzo.

Milwaukee Brewers
On January 19, 2015, the Rangers traded Sardiñas, Corey Knebel, and Marcos Diplan to the Milwaukee Brewers for starting pitcher Yovani Gallardo. He batted .196/.240/.216 in 36 games for the Brewers in 2015, while also playing for the Colorado Springs Sky Sox of the Class AAA Pacific Coast League (PCL).

Seattle Mariners
On November 20, 2015, the Brewers traded Sardiñas to the Seattle Mariners for Ramón Flores. Sardiñas hit his first major league home run on April 5, 2016, off of reliever Andrew Faulkner of the Rangers. He batted .181/.203/.264 in 72 at bats for the Mariners during the 2016 season, while also playing for the Tacoma Rainiers of the PCL.

San Diego Padres
On August 15, 2016, the Mariners traded Sardiñas to the San Diego Padres in return for a player to be named later or cash considerations. He batted .287 for the Padres for the remainder of the 2016 season, and competed to become the Padres' starting shortstop in 2017. He did not win the starting shortstop role, but made the team as a reserve He batted .163/.226/.163 in 2017 before the Padres designated him for assignment on May 21.

Baltimore Orioles
The Baltimore Orioles claimed Sardiñas off of waivers on May 24. They outrighted him to the Norfolk Tides of the Class AAA International League on May 26. He was outrighted to AAA Norfolk Tides again on July 6, 2018. He elected free agency on October 2, 2018.

Washington Nationals
On January 22, 2019, Sardiñas signed a minor league contract with the Washington Nationals. He became a free agent following the 2019 season,  but later re-signed to a minor league deal in the offseason.
After the 2019 season, he played for Caribes de Anzoátegui of the Liga Venezolana de Béisbol Profesional(LVMP).

On May 29, 2020, Sardiñas was released by Nationals.
After the 2020 season, he played for Caribes of the LVMP. He has also played for Venezuela in the 2021 Caribbean Series.

Mariachis de Guadalajara
On February 15, 2021, Sardiñas signed with the Mariachis de Guadalajara of the Mexican League.

Algodoneros de Unión Laguna
On August 1, 2022, Sardiñas was traded to the Algodoneros de Unión Laguna of the Mexican League.

See also
 List of Major League Baseball players from Venezuela

References

External links

1993 births
Living people
Algodoneros de Unión Laguna players
Arizona League Rangers players
Baltimore Orioles players
Caribes de Anzoátegui players
Colorado Springs Sky Sox players
El Paso Chihuahuas players
Fresno Grizzlies players
Frisco RoughRiders players
Harrisburg Senators players
Hickory Crawdads players
Major League Baseball players from Venezuela
Major League Baseball shortstops
Mariachis de Guadalajara players
Milwaukee Brewers players
Myrtle Beach Pelicans players
Norfolk Tides players
People from Bolívar (state)
San Diego Padres players
Seattle Mariners players
Surprise Saguaros players
Tacoma Rainiers players
Texas Rangers players
Tiburones de La Guaira players
Venezuelan expatriate baseball players in Mexico
Venezuelan expatriate baseball players in the United States